Earth Trek was a travel and adventure program produced by Palm Springs production company Raven Productions. The show was hosted and written by award-winning author, playwright, screenwriter and journalist, Joni Ravenna, who had previously hosted Great Sports Vacations, and Ticket To Adventure and now hosts Hello Paradise, and John Stevens. It also featured celebrity guests, including Sean Astin, Tate Donovan, Nancy Kwan, Michael Weiss. It was distributed on PBS stations from coast to coast beginning September 2001.

External links 

 Earth Trek − Official Website
Earth Trek | Link TV
Earth Trek Through Arizona | KCET

American travel television series